The 1998 Stanley Cup Finals was the championship series of the National Hockey League's (NHL) 1997–98 season, and the culmination of the 1998 Stanley Cup playoffs. It was contested by the Western Conference champion and defending Stanley Cup champion Detroit Red Wings and the Eastern Conference champion Washington Capitals. It was the 105th year of the Stanley Cup being contested. The series was the Capitals' first appearance in a Stanley Cup Finals since the franchise's inception in 1974. The Red Wings won the series for the second year in a row, four games to none, to capture their ninth Stanley Cup in team history. This was the fourth consecutive Stanley Cup Finals that concluded with a sweep, as well as the most recent time it has happened.

Motivation to win a second straight title
Just six days after sweeping the Philadelphia Flyers in the 1997 Finals, Red Wings defenceman Vladimir Konstantinov and masseur Sergei Mnatsakanov sustained serious brain injuries when the limousine in which they were riding crashed. Viacheslav Fetisov was also in the limousine but was not seriously injured. The Red Wings subsequently dedicated their 1997–98 season to the two injured members and wore a patch on their jerseys bearing the players' initials. When the Red Wings were presented with the Stanley Cup, they wheeled Konstantinov onto the ice and placed the Cup in his lap. They also took him for a victory lap around the rink.

Paths to the Finals

Detroit advanced to the Finals by defeating the Phoenix Coyotes, St. Louis Blues, and Dallas Stars in six games each.

Washington defeated the Boston Bruins 4–2, the Ottawa Senators 4–1, and the Buffalo Sabres 4–2.

Game summaries
In this series, Capitals head coach Ron Wilson became the first person to head coach in both an Olympics and a Stanley Cup Finals in the same year, having coached team USA at the Nagano Olympics. Peter Laviolette would join him in this feat in  while with the Carolina Hurricanes during their championship season, having coached the American ice hockey team during the Torino Olympics.

Game one

At home, Detroit took an early lead in the first period and scored two goals within two minutes and 14 seconds of each other. The Red Wings were able to hold off a Washington assault and take the first game of the series with a score of 2–1.

Game two

It looked as if the Capitals were to tie the series with a 4–2 lead in the third period, but after a Detroit goal to make it 4–3, Capitals forward Esa Tikkanen had a
scoring opportunity midway through the third period that would have likely put Detroit away before the venue changed back to Washington's MCI Center, and also would have changed the entire dynamic of the series, but he missed the open net shot. Detroit then rallied late in the third period to tie the game and send it into overtime. Kris Draper scored with four minutes left in the first overtime to give the Red Wings a 5–4 victory and a 2–0 lead in the series.

Game three

Detroit scored in the first 35 seconds to take an early lead which held up until the third period. The Capitals tied the game midway through the third period, but Sergei Fedorov scored to give the Wings a three games to none lead in the series.

Game four

In game four, Detroit was dominant throughout to win the game by a score of 4–1 and sweep the series. Steve Yzerman was awarded the Conn Smythe Trophy as the most valuable player in the playoffs. When the Cup was awarded, Vladimir Konstantinov was brought onto the ice in his wheelchair and joined the celebration with his team.

Team rosters
Bolded years under Finals appearance indicates year won Stanley Cup.

Detroit Red Wings

Washington Capitals

Stanley Cup engraving
The 1998 Stanley Cup was presented to Red Wings captain Steve Yzerman by NHL Commissioner Gary Bettman following the Red Wings 4–1 win over the Capitals in game four

The following Red Wings players and staff had their names engraved on the Stanley Cup

1997–98 Detroit Red Wings

Stanley Cup engravings
 Konstantinov's career ended in a car accident. The Red Wings still recognized him as part of the team and got permission from the league to have his name engraved.
 Wally Crossman was the oldest person engraved on the Stanley Cup at age 87.
 Detroit wanted to include a record 55 names on the Stanley Cup in 1997–98. Following that request, the NHL decided to limit the number of names to 52 to make sure all names fit on the Cup. Players who play in Stanley Cup Finals, or play at least 41 regular season games for the winning team, must be included on the Cup each year. Other players who do not officially qualify may also be included if requested by the team. There are no rules for which non-players must be included on the Stanley Cup, only a limit on total number of names going on the cup. No player who officially qualifies may be left off to include more non-players.
Included on the team picture, but left off the Stanley Cup
 #34 Norm Maracle† (G – 4 games played), #21 Darryl Laplante† (D – played 2 games) did not qualify to win the Stanley Cup. Both players spent majority of the season of in the minors.  Maracle played 66 games in goal for Adirondack while Darryl Laplante played 77 on defence. 
Art Mnatsusakanov†, Johnny Remejes†, Mike Vella† (Dressing Room Asst.) – all 5 members were awarded Stanley Cup Rings

Broadcasting
In Canada, the series was televised on CBC. In the United States, Fox broadcast game one while ESPN televised games two through  four. Had the series extended, games five and seven would have been broadcast on Fox, and ESPN would have aired game six.

Aftermath
The following season, the Red Wings would reach the Western Conference Semifinals, only to be ousted by the Colorado Avalanche in six games. The Red Wings would not return to the Stanley Cup Finals until four years later, when they defeated the Carolina Hurricanes in five games. The Washington Capitals, however, missed the playoffs the following year. The Capitals would not return to the Stanley Cup Finals until 20 years later, when they would win their first Stanley Cup in franchise history after defeating the expansion Vegas Golden Knights in five games.

See also
 1997–98 NHL season
 List of Stanley Cup champions

References

 
 
 

 
Detroit Red Wings games
Washington Capitals games
Stanley Cup Finals
Stanley Cup
Stanley Cup
Stanley Cup
Ice hockey competitions in Detroit
Ice hockey competitions in Washington, D.C.
June 1998 sports events in the United States
1998 in sports in Michigan